Tabloid Magazine may refer to:

 a gossip magazine, also known as a tabloid magazine
 Tabloid Magazine (song), a song by the Australian rock group The Living End